Abdul Sajid Tamrin (20 November 1952 – 13 January 2022) was an Indonesian politician. A member of the National Mandate Party, he served as mayor of Baubau from 2013 to 2022. He died in Jakarta on 13 January 2022, at the age of 69.

References

1952 births
2022 deaths
Indonesian politicians
National Mandate Party politicians
Padjadjaran University alumni
People from Southeast Sulawesi